Nicola Camolese (born 2 April 2005) is an Italian professional footballer who plays for Venezia.

Club career 
Nicola Camolese first played football in Motta di Livenza, before joining the Venezia FC academy in 2019.

Having made his primavera debut in February 2022, he became a full member of the under-19 team during the 2022–23 pre-season, before seeing a succession of covid cases leading to a first team call, before the first game of the season.

Camolese made his professional debut for Venezia on the 7 August 2022, replacing Bjarki Bjarkason at the 64th minute of a 2–3 Coppa Italia loss to Ascoli. Aged only 17, he had then played more minutes with the first team than with the primavera.

References

External links

2005 births
Living people
Italian footballers
Association football defenders
Venezia F.C. players